The Zia-Majumdar family is a Bangladeshi political family that leads a major political party, the Bangladesh Nationalist Party.  Members of the family - Ziaur Rahman served as army chief and later President of Bangladesh and Khaleda Zia as Prime Minister of Bangladesh, while several others have been members of the parliament.

Before marriage

Mandals of Mahishaban 
Kamaluddin Mandal (born 1854): He was a moulvi from Gabtali, Bogra. He migrated from Mahishaban village to Nashipur-Bagbari after marrying Begum Meherunnisa, daughter of Karim Bakhsh Taluqdar, son of Ala Mahmud Paikar, son of Rajab Mahmud Pramanik, son of Ahladi Mandal. His wife's ancestors migrated from Iran to Balurghat, Ghoraghat during the Mughal period.
Mahmud Mandal: Skin merchant.
Zahiruddin Mandal: Landlord.
Mazhabuddin Mandal
Moazzam Hossain Mandal: Engineer.
Mansur Rahman Mandal (died 1966): He was a chemist who specialised in paper and ink chemistry and worked for a government department at Writers' Building in Kolkata. He married Jahanara Khatun.
Rezaur Rahman Mandal, marine engineer
Mizanur Rahman Mandal, economist
Ziaur Rahman (see below)
Ahmad Kamal Mandal (d. 2017)
Khalilur Rahman Mandal (d. 2014): He was a pharmacist based in Maryland and had three daughters.
Major Muhammad Mamtazur Rahman Mandal: Medical officer for Pakistan Army
Mahfuzur Rahman Mandal: Income tax practitioner
Fatema Khatun: Married an SDO under the Maharaja of Cooch Behar
Rahima Khatun: Married detective Muhammad Shamsuddin.

Majumdars of Fulgazi 
Murad Khan: He was a Middle Eastern merchant who arrived to Chittagong in 1553, but later moved to Sripur in Fulgazi due to devastating floods in Chittagong. He had four sons: Nahar Muhammad Khan, Tahir Muhammad Khan, Phul Muhammad Khan and Arif Muhammad Khan.
Phul Muhammad Khan  (son of Murad Khan): He fought under Shamsher Ghazi against the Twipra Kingdom, and gained the title of Ghazi. The area came to be known as Phulgazi, or Fulgazi, after him.
Nahar Muhammad Khan (son of Murad Khan): He built a large reservoir in his palace in 1701. To the west of this reservoir, the family built a three-domed mosque which is now known as the Sripur Jami Mosque and continues to be used today. The Maharaja of Tripura signed a peace treaty with Shamsher Gazi and his forces which included Nahar and Phulgazi. The treaty mentioned that Nahar received 80 droṇ of revenue-free land, 14 zamindari mouzas and the title of Majumdar. These 14 mouzas make up the modern-day Fulgazi Union.
Azgar Ali Majumdar (eldest of the five sons of Nahar Muhammad Khan): He had five sons named Aqamat Ali Majumdar, Hashmat Ali Majumdar, Bashrat Ali Majumdar, Salamat Ali Majumdar and Mafizul Islam Majumdar
Aqamat Ali Majumdar (son of Azgar Ali Majumdar): He had no sons
Basharat Ali Majumdar (son of Azgar Ali Majumdar): He was a father of two
Hashmat Ali Majumdar (son of Azgar Ali Majumdar): He had five sons named Tufazzal Husayn Majumdar, Tabarak Husayn Majumdar, Muhammad Sadiq Majumdar, Vilayat Husayn Majumdar and Mazharul Husayn Majumdar
Mazharul Husayn Majumder (son of Hashmat Ali Majumdar): He was also known as Muzzammil Ali Majumdar and became a Sufi pir by the sobriquet of Pir Pagla Dervish (died November 1975).
Mafizul Ali Majumdar (son of Azgar Ali Majumdar): He died before marriage. 
Salamat Ali Majumdar (son of Azgar Ali Majumdar): He had seven sons; most notably Muqaddas Ali Majumdar and Iskandar Ali Majumdar
Iskandar Ali Majumder (son of Salamat Ali Majumdar): He was a wealthy tea-businessman who married Begum Taiyaba and migrated to Dinajpur.
Shelina Islam: She married Muhammad Rafiqul Islam Chowdhury, was the former vice-chancellor of Islamic University, Bangladesh, professor of economics at the University of Rajshahi and treasurer of Pundra University of Science and Technology.
Muhammad Shahrin Islam Chowdhury (Tuhin), was a former parliamentarian (1996).
Khurshid Jahan (1939–2006), former Minister of Women and Children Affairs (2001–2006)
Khaleda Khanam Putul (see below)
Sayeed Iskander Majumdar (1953–2012), former parliamentarian (2001–2006) and founding chairman of Islamic TV
Shelima Rahman
Shamim Iskander Majumdar

Saiful Islam Duke

Members of the Majumder-Zia family 
Ziaur Rahman (President of Bangladesh, 1979–1981; freedom fighter and military administrator) and Begum Khaleda Zia (Prime Minister of Bangladesh, 1991–1996 and 2001–2006)
Tarique Rahman (born 1965): Senior Vice-Chairman of the Bangladesh Nationalist Party He married Zobaida Rahman, daughter of navy chief Mahbub Ali Khan.
Zaima Rahman: Barrister.
Arafat Rahman Koko (1969–2015): Former Chairman of the Development Committee of Bangladesh Cricket Board He married Sharmila Sithi.
Zahia Rahman
Zaifa Rahman

See also 
List of political families

References 

 
Political families of Bangladesh
Bangladesh Nationalist Party